Andrey Nikolaevich Kolmogorov (25 April 1903 – 20 October 1987) was a Soviet mathematician who contributed to the mathematics of probability theory, topology, intuitionistic logic, turbulence, classical mechanics, algorithmic information theory and computational complexity.

Biography

Early life
Andrey Kolmogorov was born in Tambov, about 500 kilometers south-southeast of Moscow, in 1903. His unmarried mother, Maria Yakovlevna Kolmogorova, died giving birth to him. Andrey was raised by two of his aunts in Tunoshna (near Yaroslavl) at the estate of his grandfather, a well-to-do nobleman.

Little is known about Andrey's father. He was supposedly named Nikolai Matveyevich Katayev and had been an agronomist. Katayev had been exiled from Saint Petersburg to the Yaroslavl province after his participation in the revolutionary movement against the tsars. He disappeared in 1919 and was presumed to have been killed in the Russian Civil War.

Andrey Kolmogorov was educated in his aunt Vera's village school, and his earliest literary efforts and mathematical papers were printed in the school journal "The Swallow of Spring". Andrey (at the age of five) was the "editor" of the mathematical section of this journal. Kolmogorov's first mathematical discovery was published in this journal: at the age of five he noticed the regularity in the sum of the series of odd numbers:  etc.

In 1910, his aunt adopted him, and they moved to Moscow, where he graduated from high school in 1920. Later that same year, Kolmogorov began to study at Moscow State University and at the same time Mendeleev Moscow Institute of Chemistry and Technology. Kolmogorov writes about this time: "I arrived at Moscow University with a fair knowledge of mathematics. I knew in particular the beginning of set theory. I studied many questions in articles in the Encyclopedia of Brockhaus and Efron, filling out for myself what was presented too concisely in these articles."

Kolmogorov gained a reputation for his wide-ranging erudition. While an undergraduate student in college, he attended the seminars of the Russian historian S. V. Bakhrushin, and he published his first research paper on the fifteenth and sixteenth centuries' landholding practices in the Novgorod Republic. During the same period (1921–22), Kolmogorov worked out and proved several results in set theory and in the theory of Fourier series.

Adulthood
In 1922, Kolmogorov gained international recognition for constructing a Fourier series that diverges almost everywhere. Around this time, he decided to devote his life to mathematics.

In 1925, Kolmogorov graduated from Moscow State University and began to study under the supervision of Nikolai Luzin. He formed a lifelong close friendship with Pavel Alexandrov, a fellow student of Luzin; indeed, several researchers have concluded that the two friends were involved in a homosexual relationship, although neither acknowledged this openly during their lifetimes. Kolmogorov (together with Aleksandr Khinchin) became interested in probability theory. Also in 1925, he published his work in intuitionistic logic, "On the principle of the excluded middle", in which he proved that under a certain interpretation, all statements of classical formal logic can be formulated as those of intuitionistic logic. In 1929, Kolmogorov earned his Doctor of Philosophy (Ph.D.) degree, from Moscow State University.

In 1930, Kolmogorov went on his first long trip abroad, traveling to Göttingen and Munich, and then to Paris. He had various scientific contacts in Göttingen, first with Richard Courant and his students working on limit theorems, where diffusion processes turned out to be the limits of discrete random processes, then with Hermann Weyl in intuitionistic logic, and lastly with Edmund Landau in function theory. His pioneering work, About the Analytical Methods of Probability Theory, was published (in German) in 1931. Also in 1931, he became a professor at Moscow State University.

In 1933, Kolmogorov published his book, Foundations of the Theory of Probability, laying the modern axiomatic foundations of probability theory and establishing his reputation as the world's leading expert in this field. In 1935, Kolmogorov became the first chairman of the department of probability theory at Moscow State University. Around the same years (1936) Kolmogorov contributed to the field of ecology and generalized the Lotka–Volterra model of predator–prey systems.

During the Great Purge in 1936, Kolmogorov's doctoral advisor Nikolai Luzin became a high-profile target of Stalin's regime, in what is now called the "Luzin Affair". Kolmogorov and several other students of Luzin testified against Luzin, accusing him of plagiarism, nepotism, and other forms of misconduct; the hearings eventually concluded that he was a servant to "fascistoid science" and thus an enemy of the Soviet people. Luzin lost his academic positions, but curiously, he was not arrested nor expelled from the Academy of Sciences of the Soviet Union. The question of whether Kolmogorov and others were coerced into testifying against their teacher remains a topic of considerable speculation among historians; all parties involved refused to publicly discuss the case for the rest of their lives. Soviet-Russian mathematician Semën Samsonovich Kutateladze concluded in 2013, after reviewing archival documents made available during the 1990s and other surviving testimonies, that the students of Luzin had initiated the accusations against Luzin out of personal acrimony; there was no evidence that the students were coerced by the state, nor was there any evidence to support their allegations of academic misconduct. Soviet historian of mathematics A.P. Yushkevich surmised that, unlike many of the other high-profile persecutions of the era, Stalin did not personally initiate the persecution of Luzin, and eventually concluded that he was not a threat to the regime, which would explain the unusually mild punishment relative to other contemporaries.

In a 1938 paper, Kolmogorov "established the basic theorems for smoothing and predicting stationary stochastic processes"—a paper that had major military applications during the Cold War. In 1939, he was elected a full member (academician) of the USSR Academy of Sciences.

During World War II Kolmogorov contributed to the Soviet war effort by applying statistical theory to artillery fire, developing a scheme of stochastic distribution of barrage balloons intended to help protect Moscow from German bombers.

In his study of stochastic processes, especially Markov processes, Kolmogorov and the British mathematician Sydney Chapman independently developed the pivotal set of equations in the field, which have been given the name of the Chapman–Kolmogorov equations.

Later, Kolmogorov focused his research on turbulence, where his publications (beginning in 1941) influenced the field. In classical mechanics, he is best known for the Kolmogorov–Arnold–Moser theorem, first presented in 1954 at the International Congress of Mathematicians. In 1957, working jointly with his student Vladimir Arnold, he solved a particular interpretation of Hilbert's thirteenth problem. Around this time he also began to develop, and was considered a founder of, algorithmic complexity theory – often referred to as Kolmogorov complexity theory.

Kolmogorov married Anna Dmitrievna Egorova in 1942. He pursued a vigorous teaching routine throughout his life, not only at the university level but also with younger children, as he was actively involved in developing a pedagogy for gifted children (in literature, music, and mathematics). At Moscow State University, Kolmogorov occupied different positions, including the heads of several departments: probability, statistics, and random processes; mathematical logic. He also served as the Dean of the Moscow State University Department of Mechanics and Mathematics.

In 1971, Kolmogorov joined an oceanographic expedition aboard the research vessel Dmitri Mendeleev. He wrote a number of articles for the Great Soviet Encyclopedia. In his later years, he devoted much of his effort to the mathematical and philosophical relationship between probability theory in abstract and applied areas.

Kolmogorov died in Moscow in 1987, and his remains were buried in the Novodevichy cemetery.

A quotation attributed to Kolmogorov is [translated into English]: "Every mathematician believes that he is ahead of the others. The reason none state this belief in public is because they are intelligent people."

Vladimir Arnold once said: "Kolmogorov – Poincaré – Gauss – Euler – Newton, are only five lives separating us from the source of our science".

Awards and honours
Kolmogorov received numerous awards and honours both during and after his lifetime:

 Member of the Russian Academy of Sciences
 Awarded the Stalin Prize in 1941
 Elected an Honorary Member of the American Academy of Arts and Sciences in 1959
 Elected member of the American Philosophical Society in 1961
 Award the Balzan Prize in 1962
 Elected a Foreign Member of the Royal Netherlands Academy of Arts and Sciences in 1963
 Elected a Foreign Member of the Royal Society (ForMemRS) in 1964.
 Awarded the Lenin Prize in 1965
 Elected member of the United States National Academy of Sciences in 1967
 Awarded the Wolf Prize in 1980
 Awarded the Lobachevsky Prize in 1986

The following are named in Kolmogorov's honour:

 Fisher–Kolmogorov equation
 Johnson–Mehl–Avrami–Kolmogorov equation
 Kolmogorov axioms
 Kolmogorov equations (also known as the Fokker–Planck equations in the context of diffusion and in the forward case)
 Kolmogorov dimension (upper box dimension)
 Kolmogorov–Arnold theorem
 Kolmogorov–Arnold–Moser theorem
 Kolmogorov continuity theorem
 Kolmogorov's criterion
 Kolmogorov extension theorem
 Kolmogorov's three-series theorem
 Convergence of Fourier series
 Gnedenko-Kolmogorov central limit theorem
 Quasi-arithmetic mean (it is also called Kolmogorov mean)
 Kolmogorov homology
 Kolmogorov's inequality
 Landau–Kolmogorov inequality
 Kolmogorov integral
 Brouwer–Heyting–Kolmogorov interpretation
 Kolmogorov microscales
 Kolmogorov's normability criterion
 Fréchet–Kolmogorov theorem
 Kolmogorov space
 Kolmogorov complexity
 Kolmogorov–Smirnov test
 Wiener filter (also known as Wiener–Kolmogorov filtering theory)
 Wiener–Kolmogorov prediction
 Kolmogorov automorphism
 Kolmogorov's characterization of reversible diffusions
 Borel–Kolmogorov paradox
 Chapman–Kolmogorov equation
 Hahn–Kolmogorov theorem
 Johnson–Mehl–Avrami–Kolmogorov equation
 Kolmogorov–Sinai entropy
 Astronomical seeing described by Kolmogorov's turbulence law
 Kolmogorov structure function
 Kolmogorov–Uspenskii machine model
 Kolmogorov's zero–one law
 Kolmogorov–Zurbenko filter
 Kolmogorov's two-series theorem
 Rao–Blackwell–Kolmogorov theorem
 Khinchin–Kolmogorov theorem
 Kolmogorov's Strong Law of Large Numbers

Bibliography
A bibliography of his works appeared in 

 
 Translation: 
 1991–93. Selected works of A.N. Kolmogorov, 3 vols. Tikhomirov, V. M., ed., Volosov, V. M., trans. Dordrecht:Kluwer Academic Publishers. 
 1925. "On the principle of the excluded middle" in Jean van Heijenoort, 1967. A Source Book in Mathematical Logic, 1879–1931. Harvard Univ. Press: 414–37.
 
 
 Kolmogorov, Andrei N. (2005) Selected works. In 6 volumes. Moscow (in Russian)
Textbooks:
 A. N. Kolmogorov and B. V. Gnedenko. "Limit distributions for sums of independent random variables", 1954.
 A. N. Kolmogorov and S. V. Fomin. "Elements of the Theory of Functions and Functional Analysis", Publication 1999, Publication 2012
 Kolmogorov, Andrey Nikolaevich; Fomin, Sergei Vasilyevich (1975) [1970]. Introductory real analysis. New York: Dover Publications. ..

References

External links

 Portal dedicated to AN Kolmogorov (his scientific and popular publications, articles about him).
 The Legacy of Andrei Nikolaevich Kolmogorov
 Biography at Scholarpedia
 Derzhavin Tambov State University - Institute of Mathematics, Physics and Information Technology 
 The origins and legacy of Kolmogorov's Grundbegriffe
  Vitanyi, P.M.B., Andrey Nikolaevich Kolmogorov. Scholarpedia, 2(2):2798; 2007
 Collection of links to Kolmogorov resources
 Interview with Professor A. M. Yaglom about Kolmogorov, Gelfand and other (1988, Ithaca, New York)
 Kolmogorov School at Moscow University
 Annual Kolmogorov Lecture at the Computer Learning Research Centre at Royal Holloway, University of London
 Lorentz G. G., Mathematics and Politics in the Soviet Union from 1928 to 1953
 Kutateladze S. S., Sic Transit... or Heroes, Villains, and Rights of Memory.
 Kutateladze S. S., The Tragedy of Mathematics in Russia
 Video recording of the G. Falkovich's lecture: "Andrey Nikolaevich Kolmogorov (1903–1987) and the Russian school"
 

1903 births
1987 deaths
20th-century Russian educators
20th-century Russian mathematicians
People from Tambov
People from Tambovsky Uyezd
Academicians of the USSR Academy of Pedagogical Sciences
Corresponding members of the Romanian Academy
Fellows of the American Academy of Arts and Sciences
Foreign associates of the National Academy of Sciences
Foreign Members of the Royal Society
Full Members of the USSR Academy of Sciences
Members of the American Philosophical Society
Members of the French Academy of Sciences
Members of the German Academy of Sciences at Berlin
Members of the German Academy of Sciences Leopoldina
Members of the Royal Netherlands Academy of Arts and Sciences
Moscow State University alumni
Academic staff of Moscow State University
Heroes of Socialist Labour
Stalin Prize winners
Lenin Prize winners
Recipients of the Order of Lenin
Recipients of the Order of the Red Banner of Labour
Wolf Prize in Mathematics laureates
Approximation theorists
Control theorists
Dynamical systems theorists
Fluid dynamicists
Historians of mathematics
Measure theorists
Probability theorists
Systems scientists
Textbook writers
Topologists
Russian educators
Russian information theorists
Russian logicians
Russian mathematicians
Russian statisticians
Soviet educators
Soviet logicians
Soviet mathematicians
Burials at Novodevichy Cemetery